Beginners, Please is an Australian television series which aired 1961 on ABC in Melbourne. Hosted by Gerry Hyman, it was a 30-minute live variety show featuring acts who were new to television.

The first episode aired 27 January 1961, while the final episode aired 10 March 1961.

References

External links
Beginners, Please on IMDb

1961 Australian television series debuts
1961 Australian television series endings
Black-and-white Australian television shows
English-language television shows
Australian live television series
Australian variety television shows
Australian Broadcasting Corporation original programming